Greatest Hits is the first greatest hits album released by Fugees. The album was released on March 25, 2003, by the group's former record label, Columbia Records. The album features a range of material from both of the group's studio albums, as well as previously unreleased material.

Track listing
Standard edition
 "Vocab (Refugees Hip Hop Mix)"
 "Nappy Heads (Remix Radio Edit)"
 "Fu-Gee-La"
 "How Many Mics" 
 "Killing Me Softly With His Song"
 "No Woman, No Cry"
 "Cowboys"
 "The Score"
 "The Sweetest Thing (Mahogany Mix)"
 "Ready or Not (Salaam's Ready for the Show Remix)

Charts

Certifications

References

2003 greatest hits albums
Fugees compilation albums
Albums produced by Wyclef Jean
Columbia Records compilation albums